The Herveys Range Heritage Tea Rooms are an historical cafe located at the top of the Hervey Range, approximately  north-west of Townsville in North Queensland, Australia. The tea rooms are famous for being the only cafe in Queensland to include kopi luwak coffee on their menu, hailed as the most expensive coffee in the world.

Kopi luwak 
Kopi luwak is an Indonesian coffee made from beans that have passed through the digestive system of the Asian palm civet (Paradoxurus hermaphroditus), known in Indonesia as the luwak.  Collected from the floor of the jungle, the defecated beans are dried and roasted, and then exported for a price of up to A$1,250 per kilogram.

North Queensland's oldest building 
The Heritage Tea Rooms are situated inside North Queensland's oldest building - a split log construction built circa 1865.  Formerly known as the Eureka Hotel, the building has been restored to its former glory and remains standing as one of the countries few slab sided inn's. In the 1860s the inn provided a welcome respite for early travelers ascending the range via Thorntons Gap.

Other attractions 
Aside from kopi luwak, the Heritage Tea Rooms provide a variety of attractions including:
 Birdwatching - with over 150 varieties of birds in the local vicinity.
 Close proximity to the Herveys Range scenic drive, with direct road access to Charters Towers and the Atherton Tablelands

In the media 
On 1 July 2007, the Australian Channel Seven show Border Security: Australia's Front Line ran a story on kopi luwak being imported into Australia.  Customs officials decided after much deliberation that the rare coffee would pose no threat to the Australian agricultural industry, and approved the importation.  For many viewers, this was the first they had ever heard of kopi luwak.

The next day on 2 July, the Channel Seven breakfast chat show Sunrise based their morning weather presentations from the Heritage Tea Rooms.  Weather presenter Monique Wright confirmed during this episode of Sunrise that the Heritage Tea Room was in fact linked to the Border Security story on the importation of the kopi luwak.

References

External links
 Heritage Tea Rooms
 4WD Tag-ALong Tours via Heritage Tea Rooms

Coffeehouses and cafés in Australia
Buildings and structures in Townsville
Tourist attractions in Queensland
Restaurants in Queensland